David Atrakchi (born 10 December  1977) is an actor best known for his role of Malcolm Manville in Transporter 3. He played Lanyon in the 2011 thriller Faces in the Crowd. He was an actor and co-producer of Frank & Lola, a 2016 noir love story written and directed by Matthew Ross. Most recently David is featured as an android in Detroit: Become Human, an adventure game blockbuster developed by Quantic Dream and published by Sony Interactive Entertainment for PlayStation 4, released worldwide on 25 May 2018. 

In 2019, he produced the French portion of Prentice Penny's feature Uncorked for Netflix with Mandalay Pictures.

Biography
Born in Yugoslavia, David Atrakchi spent his childhood in Opatija and Baghdad, Iraq. Now based between Los Angeles and Paris, he studied theatre, dramatic arts and film at New York University with esteemed acting coach Jack Waltzer, a member of the Actors Studio. In 2005 he became one of the founding partners of the French film production company and artists collaborative FullDawa Films. He has directed & produced several short films as well as a documentary for UNESCO titled A World for Inclusion featuring Philip Seymour Hoffman.

With his company FullDawa Films, he has recently handled the production services and coproduced the feature films, My Old Lady by Israël Horovitz, starring Kevin Kline, Dame Maggie Smith and Dame Kristin Scott Thomas, and Frank & Lola a Sundance premiere in 2016, directed by Matthew Ross with Imogen Poots, Michael Shannon, Rosanna Arquette, and Emmanuelle Devos.

Film career
David's first lead role was in the independent film Broken Idyll by Victoria Raiser. In 2008, he appeared as Malcolm Manville alongside Jason Statham and François Berléand in Transporter 3 by Olivier Megaton, produced and written by Luc Besson. Later David appeared in a series of 5 short films for Tag Heuer -Meridiist by director Pierre Morel.

In 2010, he shoot for Fred Vargas book adaptation "Un Lieu Incertain" by Josée Dayan, starring alongside Jean-Hugues Anglade, Charlotte Rampling and Pascal Greggory. The same year David filmed Faces in the Crowd in Canada. Directed by Julien Magnat, it stars Milla Jovovich, Julian McMahon, Sarah Wayne Callies, Michael Shanks and Marianne Faithfull.

In spring 2011, he shot for Blind Watching in Portugal by Andrzej Jakimowski with Alexandra Maria Lara and Edward Hogg and two episodes for Canal+ in Prague as "Yves d'Allègre" in Borgia written by Tom Fontana with John Doman. David shot in November 2011 "Au Nom D'Athènes" a 2X52' for the network Arte as Xerxes with Persian dialogue.
The same year he is shooting for HBO in Toronto throughout May 2012, Transporter: The Series directed by Bruce McDonald (director) with Chris Vance (actor) and Delphine Chanéac.

In 2013, David stars and produces Camille Delamarre (Brick Mansions) directorial debut film Last Call collecting over 20 nominations worldwide such as Montréal World Film Festival, Palm Springs International Festival of Short Films, Brest European Short Film Festival. He also receives several acting nominations and one acting award  at the Festival du film de Vendôme for Pour la France directed by Shanti Masud.

He is also the leading actor of the official video directed by Antony Hoffman (Red Planet (film))  for the Lamborghini Huracán LP 610-4, aired for the first time 4 March 2014, during the Geneva Motor Show.

David's upcoming theatrical release is 16 December 2015 House of Time directed by Jonathan Helpert with Pierre Deladonchamps, Julie Judd, Esther Comar, Julia Piaton, Bengamin Wamgermee and Maxime Dambrin. The movie has premiered at the Angoulême film festival, La Baule film festival and soon at the Boulder and Austin Film Festival.

He also acted and co-produced  Frank & Lola a 2016 noir love story written and directed by Matthew Ross and starring Michael Shannon, Imogen Poots, Michael Nyqvist, Justin Long, Emmanuelle Devos and Rosanna Arquette.

Honours and awards 
 2013 acting award  at the Festival du film de Vendôme for Pour la France directed by Shanti Masud
 2013 acting nomination ÉCU The European Independent Film festival for Last Call directed by Camille Delamarre

References

External links

 Official UNESCO website - A World for Inclusion
 Website - Full Dawa Films
 Lamborghini Huracán LP 610-4 - Official Video

1977 births
Living people
American male film actors